Bojana Stamenov (born 24 June 1986) is a Serbian singer and musician best known for performing soul, jazz and R&B music, who represented Serbia, placing 10th in the Eurovision Song Contest 2015 with the song "Beauty Never Lies".  She also participates in performances for children in the Boško Buha Theatre in Belgrade. Stamenov had her first concert on 13 June, in Sava Centar in Belgrade, while working on her debut album. The singer has announced that all the records will be in English.

Ja imam talenat!
In 2012, Stamenov placed fourth in the third season of Ja imam talenat!, the Serbian version of Got Talent.

She performed live the following songs:
Chaka Khan — "I Feel for You"
James Brown — "It's a Man's Man's Man's World"
Aretha Franklin — "Think"

Discography

Singles

As lead artist

As featured artist

See also
Serbia in the Eurovision Song Contest 2015

References

External links

Living people
Eurovision Song Contest entrants of 2015
Eurovision Song Contest entrants for Serbia
Singers from Belgrade
21st-century Serbian women singers
Serbian jazz musicians
Serbian blues singers
Serbian pop singers
Got Talent contestants
1986 births
Serbian people of Bulgarian descent